K1 (before Cracovia Business Center), also Błękitek, is a commercial building in Kraków, Poland, at Pokój Street 1, near the Grzegórzeckie Roundabout. It is a 20-story building, housing offices for Bank Pekao and other brands. It is 105 metres high, which makes it the tallest building in Kraków.

Construction of the tower began in 1972, according to Janusz Ingarden's project.

References

Buildings and structures in Kraków